Beryllium hydride (systematically named poly[beryllane(2)] and beryllium dihydride) is an inorganic compound with the chemical formulan (also writtenn or ). This alkaline earth hydride is a colourless solid that is insoluble in solvents that do not decompose it.   Unlike the ionically bonded hydrides of the heavier Group 2 elements, beryllium hydride is covalently bonded (three-center two-electron bond).

Synthesis 
Unlike the other group 2 metals, beryllium does not react with hydrogen.  Instead, BeH2 is prepared from preformed beryllium(II) compounds.  It was first synthesised in 1951 by treating dimethylberyllium, Be(CH3)2, with lithium aluminium hydride, LiAlH4.

Purer BeH2 forms from the pyrolysis of di-tert-butylberyllium, Be(C(CH3)3)2 at 210 °C.

A route to highly pure samples involves the reaction of triphenylphosphine, PPh3, with beryllium borohydride, Be(BH4)2:
Be(BH4)2 + 2 PPh3 → BeH2 + 2 Ph3PBH3

Structure 

BeH2 is usually formed as an amorphous white solid, but a hexagonal crystalline form with a higher density (~0.78 g cm−3) was reported, prepared by heating amorphous BeH2 under pressure, with 0.5-2.5% LiH as a catalyst.

A more recent investigation found that crystalline beryllium hydride has a body-centred orthorhombic unit cell, containing a network of corner-sharing BeH4 tetrahedra, in contrast to the flat, hydrogen-bridged, infinite chains previously thought to exist in crystalline BeH2.

Studies of the amorphous form also find that it consists of a network of corner shared tetrahedra.

Chemical properties

Reaction with water and acids
Beryllium hydride reacts slowly with water but is rapidly hydrolysed by acid such as hydrogen chloride to form beryllium chloride.

BeH2 + 2 H2O → Be(OH)2 + 2 H2

BeH2 + 2 HCl → BeCl2 + 2 H2

Reaction with Lewis bases
Beryllium hydride reacts with trimethylamine, N(CH3)3 to form a dimeric adduct, with bridging hydrides. However, with dimethylamine, HN(CH3)2 it forms a trimeric beryllium diamide, [Be(N(CH3)2)2]3 and hydrogen.
The reaction with lithium hydride where the hydride ion is the Lewis base, forms sequentially LiBeH3 and Li2BeH4.

Dihydridoberyllium 

Dihydridoberyllium is a related compound with the chemical formula  (also written ). It is a gas that cannot persist undiluted. Unsolvated dihydridoberyllium will spontaneously autopolymerise to oligomers. Free molecular BeH2 produced by electrical discharge at high temperature has been confirmed as linear with a Be-H bond length of 133.376 pm. Its hybridisation is sp.

Chemical properties 
In theory, the two-coordinate hydridoberyllium group (-BeH) in hydridoberylliums such as dihydridoberyllium can accept an electron-pair donating ligand into the molecule by adduction:
 + L → 
Because of this acceptance of the electron-pair donating ligand (L), dihydridoberyllium has Lewis-acidic character. Dihydridoberyllium can accept two electron pairs from ligands, as in the case of the tetrahydridoberyllate(2-) anion.

References 

Beryllium compounds
Metal hydrides
Substances discovered in the 1950s